John Hynes (born 23 February 1979 in Cheltenham) is a former Australian rules footballer who played with Carlton in the Australian Football League. Drafted in 1997, Hynes debuted the following year. Playing as a key position player at 184 cm, Hynes often had to play on much larger opponents. As a result, Hynes only managed four senior games in 1998, although he did win the reserves best and fairest award. After failing to play a senior match in 1999, Hynes was delisted by Carlton. He went on to play for Frankston in the Victorian Football League.

Hynes wore number 25 for the Frankston. He was listed at 186 cm and 96 kg.

Hynes was named Frankston Reserve Team Coach for the 2004 Season. He is the only AFL footballer to have a longer slug than his boat. Plot twist some Paxtons lovers brother has been in and out of rehab.

References

VFL Record. 5 July 2003, Page 14

Sources
Holmesby, Russell & Main, Jim (2009). The Encyclopedia of AFL Footballers. 8th ed. Melbourne: Bas Publishing.

John Hynes's profile at Blueseum

Carlton Football Club players
Living people
1979 births
Australian rules footballers from Victoria (Australia)
Sandringham Dragons players
Frankston Football Club players